In geometry, an abelian Lie group is a Lie group that is an abelian group.

Let A be a compact abelian Lie group with the identity component . If  is a cyclic group, then  is topologically cyclic; i.e., has an element that generates a dense subgroup. (In particular, a torus is topologically cyclic.)

See also 
 Cartan subgroup

Citations

Works cited

Abelian group theory
Geometry
Lie groups